Eric Ellsworth Hipple (born September 16, 1957) is a public speaker and a retired professional American football player.

Early life and education
Eric Hipple was born in Lubbock, Texas.

Hipple attended Utah State University with an athletic scholarship. He earned a Bachelor of Science in Business Administration from the university's Jon M. Huntsman School of Business.

Career
Hipple was selected by the Detroit Lions in the fourth round of the 1980 NFL Draft. He played his entire 10-season NFL career for the Lions from 1980 to 1989.  He missed the whole 1987 season with a sprained thumb. His best year as a pro came during the 1985 season when he threw 17 touchdown passes.

Career statistics
 102 games
 1,546 attempts
 830 completions
 10,711 yards
 55 touchdowns

Post-athletics career
As a result of the suicide in 2000 of Hipple's 15-year-old son, Hipple is involved in educating people about the dangers of depression.  Hipple delivers speeches on suicide prevention and mental illness at high schools, youth groups, members of the military and their families, local organizations and corporations. He is the Outreach Coordinator of the Depression Center of the University of Michigan. A documentary film by the Depression Center features Hipple. He also co-authored a study about depression and pain in retired professional football players.

Hipple's book, Real Men Do Cry, was published in 2008. It discusses Hipple's playing career with the Lions, his bouts with depression, and details of the warning signs of teens who have died from suicide.

Personal life 
In 2000, Hipple's 15-year-old son Jeff died by suicide via shotgun. Hipple has acknowledged he has also suffered from bouts with depression, including his adolescence. After his son's death, Hipple abused drugs and alcohol. and was convicted of drunk driving and served time in jail. He filed for bankruptcy as well.

In 2005, Hipple disarmed a man wielding a knife at a party in Michigan.

In other media
A football poster of Hipple can be seen on the wall in the 1983 feature film Mr. Mom.

He was a guest star in the show Home Improvement as himself in Season 3 Episode 18 building a house for Habitat for Humanity guest starring several top name athletes and Former President Jimmy Carter.

References

External links

"Freeing Eric Hipple", ESPN video feature

1957 births
Living people
Sportspeople from Lubbock, Texas
American football quarterbacks
Utah State Aggies football players
Detroit Lions players